Akaki Shanidze (Born: 26 February 1887 in Nogha, Samtredia, Georgia – Died 29 March 1987 in Tbilisi, Georgia) was a Georgian linguist and philologist. He was one of the founders of the Tbilisi State University (1918) and Academician of the Georgian Academy of Sciences (1941); Doctor of Philological Sciences (1920), Professor (1920). He became a doctor in Tbilisi State University. His most important Georgian works were in linguistic sciences.

Shanidze graduated from the St. Petersburg University in 1909. His numerous works heavily influenced modern scholarly research of the Georgian and its sister Kartvelian languages both in Georgia and abroad with his tutorship of the Norwegian Kartvelologist Hans Vogt.

During his career, he was awarded:
 3 Orders of Lenin
 Order of the Red Banner of Labour
 Order of Friendship of Peoples
 Order of the Badge of Honour
 Jubilee Medal "In Commemoration of the 100th Anniversary since the Birth of Vladimir Il'ich Lenin"
 Medal "For Labour Valour"

See also 

List of Georgians

References 

Shanidze, Akaki. In: Dictionary of Georgian National Biography. 
Akaki Shanidze Foundations

1887 births
1987 deaths
Linguists from Georgia (country)
Philologists from Georgia (country)
Corresponding Members of the USSR Academy of Sciences
Centenarians from Georgia (country)
Men centenarians
Academic staff of Tbilisi State University
Kartvelian studies scholars
Members of the Georgian National Academy of Sciences
Linguists from the Soviet Union
20th-century linguists
20th-century philologists
Honoured Scientists of Georgia (country)